Castaignède is a French surname. Notable people with the surname include:

Stéphane Castaignède (born 1969), French rugby union player and coach
Thomas Castaignède (born 1975), French rugby union footballer

French-language surnames